Sir Clive Anthony Whitmore  (born 18 January 1935) is a former British senior civil servant.

Whitmore was educated at Sutton Grammar School in Surrey and Christ's College, Cambridge.

Whitmore served as Principal Private Secretary to Margaret Thatcher from 1979 to 1982. After that, he was appointed as Permanent Secretary of the Ministry of Defence and served until 1988. From 1988 to 1994, he was Permanent Under-Secretary of State at the Home Office.

Whitmore was appointed Commander of the Royal Victorian Order (CVO) in the 1983 New Year Honours and Knight Commander of the Order of the Bath (KCB) in the 1983 Birthday Honours. He was promoted to Knight Grand Cross of the Order of the Bath (GCB) in the 1988 Birthday Honours.

References

1935 births
Living people
People educated at Sutton Grammar School
Alumni of Christ's College, Cambridge
Permanent Under-Secretaries of State for Defence
Permanent Under-Secretaries of State for the Home Department
Principal Private Secretaries to the Prime Minister
Knights Grand Cross of the Order of the Bath
Commanders of the Royal Victorian Order